This is a list of television programmes broadcast by TV3 either currently broadcast or formerly broadcast on TV3 in Malaysia.

Asian Programme
 Someday or One Day
 Healing Heroes
 Love at First Bite

Drama
The Rated Is P13 Only
Akasia
Azalea
Cereka Ahad
Cerekarama
Chamsarang
Dahlia
Drama Pukul 6
Lestary
Samarinda
Sinetron
Sonia
Telenovela
 Drama Hari Ahad (Akan disiarkan pada setiap ahad, jam 3.00 - 5.00 petang) (direhatkan sementara)

News

TV3 news
Malay news:
 Buletin 1.30 -  airs daily except Friday at 1:30 pm; for a short period of time in 2004 moved to 1:00 pm and was known as Buletin Jam 1
 Berita Terkini - the latest news; news summary in 5 minutes at 7:30 am (in between Malaysia Hari Ini and Borak Kopitiam) and 2 minutes at all other times
 Buletin Akhir - the last news of the day before closing down transmissions; ended around the late 1990s
 Buletin Pagi - morning bulletin, airing daily at 9:30 am
 Buletin Utama - sometime in the 1980s,  changed times to 6:30pm and changed again to 8:00 pm
 Detik Niaga - business news program at 10:30 am
 Ringkasan Malam - 15-minute late night news summary; aired from 1991 until 1993

English news:
 Bizworld - formerly known as Business News for the English broadcast at 5:30 pm
 Nightline - late night news broadcast airing at midnight, since 1 December 1999
 TV3 Evening News  - formerly known as TV3 News; aired at 7:00 pm; aired until the late 1990s; sometime in the 1980s, it changed times to 8 pm
 TV3 News Hour  - formerly known as Late News in 1989 and TV3 Evening News in 1994; aired for either 15 minutes or 5 minutes for 1989 till 1991, airing 30 minutes since 1994 and 1 hour or 30 minutes since 1997, airing at 11:00 pm

Notes: Buletin 1.30 is broadcast every Saturday to Thursday only.

Bananana! block
 44 Cats
 Android Kikaider
 Arthur
 Avatar: The Last Airbender
 Bakugan Battle Planet
 Barbie movie series
 Barbie: Dreamtopia
 Battle Claw (also on TV2)
 Beyblade Series
 Metal Fight Beyblade
 Beyblade Burst (also aired on TA-DAA!)
 Blaze and the Monster Machines (also on TV2)
 BoBoiBoy
 BoBoiBoy Galaxy
 Bubble Guppies
 Bunsen Is a Beast
 Digimon Adventure
 Dora the Explorer
 Deer Squad 
 Ejen Ali
 Go, Diego, Go!
 Kamen Rider Series
 Kamen Rider: Dragon Knight
 Kamen Rider Build
 Kamen Rider Zi-O
 Kamen Rider Zero-One

 Kung Fu Panda: Legends of Awesomeness (also airs on NTV7)
 Larva
 Lego series
 Lego City Adventures
 Lego Friends - Girls on A Mission
 Lego Monkie Kid (also aired on NTV7 & 8TV)
 Lego Ninjago
 My Little Pony: Friendship is Magic (formerly aired on NTV7)
 Maggie & Bianca: Fashion Friends 
 Oggy and the Cockroaches (Season 5 Only)
 Ollie and Friends
 PAW Patrol
 Penguins of Madagascar
 Peppa Pig
 Pokémon Series
 Pokémon Sun and Moon
 Pokémon Sun and Moon Ultra Adventures
 Power Rangers
 Power Rangers Dino Supercharge (rerun from NTV7 starting 7 February 2019)
 The Powerpuff Girls (2016 reboot)
 Postman Pat
 Pony Life
 Rabbids Invasion (formerly aired on NTV7)
 Rat-A-Tat
 Rise of the Teenage Mutant Ninja Turtles
 Robot and Monster
 Rolling with the Ronks!
 Senario Toons
 Shimmer and Shine
 Special Rescue Exceedraft
 SpongeBob SquarePants
 StoryBots Super Songs
 Superbook
 Super Sentai
 Zyuden Sentai Kyoryuger (moved from NTV7 during repeat since 31 December 2018)
 Team Umizoomi
 Teletubbies (2015 series)
 The Adventures of Jimmy Neutron
 The Adventures of Kid Danger
 The Amazing Awang Khenit
 The Fairly OddParents
 Thomas and Friends
 Top Wing
 Trolls: The Beat Goes On!
 True and the Rainbow Kingdom
 Turning Mecard
 Wallykazam

Japanese anime
 Aikatsu! (Malaysian dubbed, and opening and closing theme are dubbed in Malaysia)
 Astroboy
 Atashinchi
 Beyblade
 Bleach
 Card Captor Sakura
 Crush Gear Turbo
 Detective Conan
 Fullmetal Alchemist
 Initial D
 Lucy of the Southern Rainbow
 Mirmo Zibang
 Mermaid Melody Pichi Pichi Pitch
 Mon Colle Knights
 My Annette
 Naruto
 Rurouni Kenshin
 Samurai 7
 Super Doll Licca
 Nanook's Great Hunt

International programmes
 Agents of S.H.I.E.L.D.
 Arrow
 Birthcare Center / Birthcare Center (12 January 2022) (Tuesday to Thursday 11:00pm to 12:00am)
 Familiar Wife / Familiar Wife (10 August 2020)
 The Flash
 Heroes
 Hotel del Luna / Hotel del Luna (October 2020) (Sponsored by Abbott Laboratories - Pediasure)
 Melting Me Softly / Melting Me Softly (10 December 2020)
 Mother / Mother (January/February 2021) (Tuesday to Thursday 11:00pm to 12:00am) 
 Kyle XY
 Mr. Bean
 NCIS
NCIS: Los Angeles
 Smallville
 Supernatural
 The Apprentice
 Winter Sonata / Winter Sonata (August 2002) (Weekdays 7:00pm to 8:00pm) 
 WWE SmackDown
 WWF SmackDown
 Missing: The Other Side / Missing: The Other Side (started May 2021)
 The Good Detective / A Model Detective (23 June 2021)Flower of Evil / Flower Of Evil (19 August 2021)The Penthouse: War in Life / The Penthouse: War In Life (26 October 2021)

Religious programmes
 Al-Kuliyyah - a religious talk show programme which discuss the topics related to Islam; aired since 1995
 Kapsul Surah Tanyalah UstazDocumentaries
 360 999 Bersamamu - a real-life documentary program focused on the underprivileged in Malaysia; aired since 2005
 Detik Tragik - a documentary series focused on major disasters happened in Malaysia; premiered in April 2015
 Ilmuwan Islam - a religious documentary show focused on Muslim scholars and scientists; aired in 2005
 Jejak Rasul - religious documentary series focused on the history of Islam and the Prophet Muhammad; aired since 1994 during the Ramadhan fasting month
 KES: Kronologi. Eksklusif. Siasatan. - crime documentary series focused on high-profiled crime cases reported in Malaysia; aired in 2010
 Majalah 3 - a flagship magazine program aired since 1987
 Nona - a women's magazine program aired since 1985. 
 Op MaritimNotes: 999 will be back on air starting 22 December 2020 because of the live broadcast Muzik Muzik 35 Separuh Akhir Third week which aired on Tuesday after broadcast this delayed to 22 November ago.

Talk shows
 Borak Kopitiam - a weekend morning talk show program aired Saturday & Sunday; aired since 2018 replacing MHI's weekend slot
 Malaysia Hari Ini - a morning talk show program aired on weekdays since 1994
 Soal Jawab - a talk show program which discusses topics related on current situation
 Soal Rakyat - a talk show program which discusses topics related on current situation, aired since 2018 (Season 1 - Since 2018: Wednesday 11:00pm to 12:00am) (Season 2 - Since 2020: Saturday 5:30pm to 6:30pm)
 Wanita Hari Ini - a women's talk show program which discusses topics related to Malaysian womanhood, aired since 2001
 Hello DoktorEntertainment and variety shows
 Melodi Muzik-Muzik Muzik Muzik 35 Separuh Akhir Vokal Mania Lagu Cinta Kita The Sherry Show J.K.K I Can See Your Voice Malaysia Sumbang Suara Terpaling JuaraSpecial entertainment programs
 Anugerah Bintang Popular
 Anugerah Juara Lagu
 Anugerah Melodi Drama Sangat
 Anugerah Skrin

Food and cooking programs
 5 Rencah 5 Rasa Jalan-Jalan Cari Makan Sarapan Spice RoutesSports
 Scoreboard Soccer NewsTravel Shows
 Go Travel (also aired on TV9 and Awesome TV) and (formerly in TV2)
 Master In The House Malaysia (16 January 2022) (Sunday 3:00pm to 4:00pm)
 Wa! Journey - Go Green in JapanPast Shows

1980s
 Gumby Kate and Allie Wiseguy Roseanne Family Ties The Lonely Hunter Hind and Dr. Noman Wildfire Dennis the Menace Mission: Impossible The Smurfs The Transformers Nona The Edison Twins Woody Woodpecker Cheers Ghostbusters Fraggle Rock Tandoori Nights She-Ra: Princess of Power I Dream of Jeannie The Flintstone Kids Small Wonder Buletin Utama Sukan TV3 The Benny Hill Show Cerekarama Jason of Star Command The Munsters Today The Get Along Gang Alfred Hitchcock Presents The S.I.B. Files Spenser: For Hire Mighty Mouse and Friends Three's Company Exciting World of Speed and Beauty Hill Street Blues TV3 Cinema Punky Brewster Disney's Adventures of the Gummi Bears L.A. Law Shadow Chasers Knight Rider Star Wars: Droids Voyage to the Bottom of the Sea National Geographic Explorer Scarecrow and Mrs. King Birds of Paradise Maya the Bee Stingray The In between Jamaluddin El-Afghani Starsky & Hutch The Bluffers Crime Story Out of This World Family Ties The Care Bears Wild, Wild World of Animals Zoo Raya Ria The Blinkins Yesterday's Glitter Heathcliff Beyond Tomorrow Hotel Captain Power and the Soldiers of the Future He-Man and the Masters of the Universe The Love Boat Tom and Jerry Emerald Point N.A.S. Here's Lucy Cumi and Ciki Mama's Boy Games People Play Mighty Mouse: The New Adventures Furaso The Adventures of the Little Prince Macron 1 Memori '84 Airwolf The Adventures of the Galaxy Rangers The Wacky Wife Magnum, P.I. Better Days Starman Panggung Perdana Super Friends Simon and Simon The Giddy Game Show Mid-Week Sports Bozo the Clown The Beverly Hillbillies Ohara Cerekapilihan Majalah 3 Spider-Woman Dr. Kildare ThunderCats Jenny's Gang It Ain't Half Hot Mum My Sister Sam Paradise Think of a Number Zoo Family Robotech She's the Sheriff S.W.A.T. News in Bahasa Malaysia Sidekicks The Benny Hill Show Starcom: The U.S. Space Force The Final Verdict Moonlighting Knots Landing The Wild Wild West The Secret of Isis Thirtysomething1990s
 Buletin Utama Evening News Buletin 1:30 Buletin Awal Majalah 3 News Hour Laman Nurani Al Kuliyyah Jejak Rasul Muzik Muzik Wanita Hari Ini Malaysia Hari Ini Sinaran 7 Alam Ria Disney Cereka Pilihan Sunday Movie Cereka Cuti Sekolah Tayangan Minggu Ini Cerekarama Selekta Emas Panggung Sabtu Identiti Dari Bilik Berita L.A. Law Imej Sekapur Sirih Nona Warta 3 Money Matters 7 O'Clock News Citra Wara Mike Hammer, Private Eye Jade Solid Gold Beyond Tomorrow America's Top 10 True Colors Kuali Besta Enak Rasa Knorr & Lady Choice Anika Rasa Kraft
 Menu Malaysia Kisah Benar Cuba-Cuba Benson & Hedges Gold & Dream Mad About You Dragon Flyz Dinosaucers Galeri Sukan Just the Ten of Us Full House Star Trek: The Next Generation Conan The Adventurer 321 Action WWF Superstars WWF Smackdown UEFA Champions League German League Highlights Spanish League Highlights English Premier League Highlights Marlboro World Of Sport Formula 1 Italian League Serie A Raze the Roof with Collette Chip 'n Dale: Rescue Rangers Ocean Girl Bodies for Evidence Alfred Hitchcock Presents The Magical Adventures of Quasimodo Airwolf The Country Mouse and the City Mouse Adventures L.A. Heat Growing Pains Sharky & George National Geographic Explorer Life Goes On Alvin and the Chipmunks Voltron: Defender of the Universe S.W.A.T. Denver, the Last Dinosaur The Tom and Jerry Kids Show ProStars The Golden Girls Grimm's Fairy Tale Classics Rescue 911 ALF Doogie Howser, M.D. Top of the Hill Jade Comedy Mr. Bogus Webster Knight Rider Father Dowling Mysteries Diplodos Mike and Angelo Simba the Lion King Family Ties Family Squad Art Attack Star Street: The Adventures of the Star Kids Cupido Waktu Berbuka Puasa & Imsak Big Brother Jake Maxie's World Zorro Felix the Cat Darkwing Duck The New WKRP in Cincinnati Rugrats The Munsters Today Mount Royal Camp Candy Galtar and the Golden Lance The Jetsons Attack of the Killer Tomatoes Seabert Pi Mai Pai Mai Tang Tu The Golden Palace Tiny Toon Adventures Fantastic Max Captain Planet and the Planeteers Dynasty The All-New Candid Camera China Beach Star Wars: Droids Rupert MacGyver Laff-A-Lympics My Secret Identity The Magical World of Disney Gophers! The Disappearing World Alien Nation The Smurfs Free Spirit Camp Wilderness Ragam Orang Kota Twinkle the Dream Being Head of the Class Baby Talk Room for Two The Mechanical Universe Tales of the Gold Monkey DuckTales Yuppies on the Move Dynamo Duck ALF: The Animated Series Saber Rider and the Star Sheriffs Cheers Wiseguy Moonlighting Thunder Alley Hawaii 5-0 Around the World in 15 Minutes Star Trek: The Animated Series Rude Dog and the Dweebs Eureeka's Castle The Legend of the Fall First Look Bush Beat Midnight Caller Doug Stunt Dawgs The New Adventures of Captain Planet The Adventures of Don Coyote and Sancho Panda Roseanne The Young Riders Little Rosey Inhumanoids Brewster Place Home Improvement The Fresh Prince of Bel-Air Katts and Dog The New Adventures of He-Man CyberCOPS Trial by Jury 13 Wonders Cow and Chicken Kingdom of Survival Tarzán The Secret World of Alex Mack Power Hits USA Blossom Toxic Crusaders Great Expectations Wide World of Kids Dumbo's Circus Robotech Kitty Cats Popeye the Sailor The Simpsons Little Star Spenser: For Hire Chicken Minute Ferris Bueller Disney's Adventures of the Gummi Bears The Tracey Ullman Show Garfield and Friends Paddington Bear AlfTales My Two Dads Counterstrike The Mickey Mouse Club Paradise Dink, the Little Dinosaur Sally the Sea Lion Empty Nest The Avengers Dear John Garrison's Gorillas Sister Kate Pound Puppies Babar Malay Blockbuster Foofur Johnny Bravo Doogie Howser, M.D. Tayangan Minggu Ini Cross of Fire Homeboys in Outer Space He-Man and the Masters of the Universe The Odyssey Aladdin Iron Man G-Force Mutt and Jeff I Love Amy All the Rivers Run TaleSpin The Wild West Sisters Chucklewood Critters Love of a Longtime Widget My Little Pony 'n Friends The Famous Teddy Z The Nutt House Oh, Mr. Toad Angel Falls Kidd Video The Shoe People Yogi's Gang Wild and Crazy Kids The Sullivans Pick of the Week The All-New Popeye Show 21 Jump Street Big Wave Dave's Evening Shade Baby and Co. Dinosaur! Spiral Zone 
 Darl BSKL Zero One Magazine Happy Days Honey, I Shrunk the Kids: The TV Show USA: Futures The Adventures of Skippy Dr. Quinn, Medicine Woman Cobra A Pup Named Scooby-Doo Ketchup: Cats Who Cook 1990 Castrol Motorcross The Professionals Walker, Texas Ranger Goof Troop Mad About You Droopy, Master Detective Dinobabies Lois & Clark: The New Adventures of Superman Star Trek: The Animated Series Rain in the Heart Midnight Caller Walking Tall A Family for Joe Return of Ultraman Ultraman Ace Ultraman Taro The Ultraman Ultraman 80 Ultraman: The Ultimate Hero Choujin Sentai Jetman2000s
 Buletin Utama Buletin Pagi Buletin 1:30 Majalah 3 360 999 Oggy and the Cockroaches Bob the Builder The Real Ghostbusters Disney's The Little Mermaid Fly Tales Honey, I Shrunk the Kids: The TV Show Little Monsters The Wacky World of Tex Avery Pingu The Why Why Family Count Duckula Godzilla: The Animated Series X-Men: Evolution Bleach Teenage Mutant Ninja Turtles Gang Starz Totally Tooned In Ketchup: Cats Who Cook Earth: Final Conflict Mighty Max WWF Smackdown Showbiz Tycoon The Wonderful World of Disney Noddy in Toyland Mother Goose and Grimm Family Guy Space Goofs The Dapatuto Show Formula 1 Under One Roof Stunt Dawgs Pinky and the Brain Hercules Transformers: Beast Machines Toonsylvania The New Adventures of Ocean Girl Ronald McDonald's Funtime KFC Hour Danger Mouse The Magician Cubeez Bollywood Dot Com Angela Anaconda Sakura Wars Dave the Barbarian Dora the Explorer Teamo Supremo Sesame Street Kelab Disney Malaysia Chicky Hour W.I.T.C.H. Winx Club Crush Gear Turbo The Crocodile Hunter's Croc Files The West Wing My Wife and Kids Justice League Teacher's Pet The Adventures of Jimmy Neutron: Boy Genius Funtoons Extreme Ghostbusters Futurama Totally Spies! SpongeBob SquarePants Woody Woodpecker Asia Hebat Ultra Seven Disney's House of Mouse Jellabies Dark Knight Brandy and Mr. Whiskers Amazing Stories DuckTales Xiaolin Showdown Baby Looney Tunes That's So Raven Bratz Gang Starz A Minute with Stan Hooper Looney Tunes Tom and Jerry Tom and Jerry Tales The Night Stalker Disney's Adventures of the Gummi Bears MTV Pulse The Emperor's New School Shuriken School Harry and His Bucket Full of Dinosaurs Bizworld Super Robot Monkey Team Hyperforce Go! Pucca (TV series) Ultraman Nexus Ultraman Max2010s
 999 2014 Asian Games (With TV9, coverage provided by host broadcaster Incheon Asian Games Host Broadcasting Management (IHB))
 2014 Commonwealth Games (With NTV7, coverage provided by host broadcaster Sunset + Vine Global Television Host Broadcasting Limited (SVGTV))
 Avatar: The Last Airbender Barney & Friends Beyblade Ben 10: Alien Force Ben 10: Ultimate Alien Brandy & Mr. Whiskers Chuggington Detective Conan Kally's Mashup Law & Order: Special Victims Unit Naruto Nur Putri Yang Ditukar Soy Luna  (Dubbed in English with Malay Subtitles, also airs on TV2, TV9 and NTV7)
 SpongeBob SquarePants Southeast Asian Games (Until 2017)
 Teacher's Pet UEFA Champions League Hannah Montana2020s
 Money Matters (Rerun show from 1990s) (Season 1: 4 July 2020, Saturday 6:00pm to 6:30pm) (Season 2: 10 October 2020, Saturday 5:00pm to 5:30pm)
 Gerak Khas The Finale'' (after more than 21 years of broadcasting on RTM), (Gerak Khas The Finale is now understood to start aired on TV3) (Breaking of 4 December 2020, Friday and Saturday 10:30pm to 11:30pm)

References

TV3 (Malaysia)
TV3 Programmes